California's 69th State Assembly district is one of 80 California State Assembly districts. It is currently represented by Democrat Tom Daly of Anaheim.

District profile 
The district encompasses the heart of Orange County, centered on the county seat of Santa Ana. The district is primarily suburban and heavily Latino.

Orange County – 15.5%
 Anaheim – 39.5%
 Garden Grove – 21.8%
 Orange – 7.4%
 Santa Ana – 87.8%

Election results from statewide races

List of Assembly Members
Due to redistricting, the 69th district has been moved around different parts of the state. The current iteration resulted from the 2011 redistricting by the California Citizens Redistricting Commission.

Election results 1992 - present

2020

2018

2016

2014

2012

2010

2008

2006

2004

2002

2000

1998

1996

1994

1992

See also 
 California State Assembly
 California State Assembly districts
 Districts in California

References

External links 
 District map from the California Citizens Redistricting Commission

69
Government in Orange County, California